ECCM may refer to:

 European Culture Collections' Organisation
 Electronic counter-countermeasures
 East Caribbean Common Market